The 2006 Florida Gators baseball team represented the University of Florida in the sport of baseball during the 2006 college baseball season. The Gators competed in Division I of the National Collegiate Athletic Association (NCAA) and the Eastern Division of the Southeastern Conference (SEC). They played their home games at Alfred A. McKethan Stadium, on the university's Gainesville, Florida campus. The team was coached by Pat McMahon, who was in his fifth season at Florida.

Roster

Schedule 

! style="background:#FF4A00;color:white;"| Regular season
|- valign="top" 

|- align="center" bgcolor="ddffdd"
| February 10 ||||No. 1
| McKethan Stadium ||10–0||Ball (1–0)
|Blevins (0–1)
|None
|4,488
|1–0|| –
|- align="center" bgcolor="ddffdd"
| February 11 ||Cincinnati||No. 1
| McKethan Stadium ||10–4||Augenstein (1–0)
|Rapp (0–1)
|None
|3,494
|2–0|| –
|- align="center" bgcolor="ddffdd"
| February 12 ||Cincinnati||No. 1
| McKethan Stadium ||20–4||LaCoste (1–0)
|Simon (0–1)
|None
|3,523
|3–0
| –
|- align="center" bgcolor="ffdddd"
| February 15 ||||No. 1
|McKethan Stadium
|2–3||Young (1–0)
|Hightower (0–1)
|Urena (1)
|3,735
|3–1
| –
|- align="center" bgcolor="ddffdd"
| February 17 ||at No. 18 Miami (FL)Rivalry||No. 1
|Mark Light StadiumCoral Gables, FL||2–1||Ball (2–0)
|Gutierrez (3–1)
|O'Day (1)
|2,164
|4–1
| –
|- align="center" bgcolor="ddffdd"
| February 18 ||at No. 18 Miami (FL)Rivalry||No. 1
|Mark Light Stadium||4–1||Augenstein (2–0)
|Miguelez (1–1)
|O'Day (2)
|2,500
|5–1
| –
|- align="center" bgcolor="ddffdd"
| February 19 ||at No. 18 Miami (FL)Rivalry||No. 1
|Mark Light Stadium||11-10||Edmondson (1–0)
|Orta (1–1)
|O'Day (3)
|2,800
|6–1
| –
|- align="center" bgcolor="ddffdd"
| February 22 ||||No. 1
| McKethan Stadium ||15–5||Edmondson (2–0)
|Mercer (0–2)
|None
|2,891
|7–1
| –
|- align="center" bgcolor="ffdddd"
| February 24 ||No. 23 Missouri||No. 1
| McKethan Stadium ||5–14||Scherzer (2–0)
|Ball (2–1)
|None
|4,372
|7–2|| –
|- align="center" bgcolor="ddffdd"
| February 25 ||||No. 1
|McKethan Stadium
|10–3||Augenstein (3–0)
|Luebke (0–1)
|None
|3,940
|8–2|| –
|- align="center" bgcolor="ffdddd"
| February 26 ||||No. 1
|McKethan Stadium||0–4||Mellies (2–0)
|LaCoste (1–1)
|None
|3,688
|8–3
| –
|- align="center" bgcolor="ffdddd"
| February 28 ||No. 6 Rivalry||No. 7
|McKethan Stadium||4–6||Chambliss (4–0)
|Gawriluk (0–1)
|Tucker (2)
|4,601
|8–4
| –
|-

|- align="center" bgcolor="ffdddd"
| March 3 ||||No. 7||McKethan Stadium||0–4||Nicholson (3–0)||Ball (2–2)||None||3,915||8–5||–
|- align="center" bgcolor="ddffdd"
| March 4 ||Texas A&M||No. 7||McKethan Stadium
|4–1||Augenstein (4–0)||Thebeau (1–1)||None||3,781||9–5
|–
|- align="center" bgcolor="ffdddd"
| March 5 ||Texas A&M||No. 7||McKethan Stadium||0–1||Creps (2–1)||Gawriluk (0–2)||Chambless (3)||3,018||9–6
|–
|- align="center" bgcolor="#F0E8E8"
| March 6 || Aoyama Gakuin (exh.) || No. 16 || McKethan Stadium ||3–6||Shun (1–0)||Helms (0–1)||None||450||–
|–
|- align="center" bgcolor="ddffdd"
| March 7 ||||No. 16|| McKethan Stadium ||2–1||Spottswood (1–0)||Currin (1–2)||Edmondson (1)||3,007||10–6
|–
|- align="center" bgcolor="ddffdd"
| March 8 ||UNC Greensboro||No. 16||McKethan Stadium
|3–1||LaCoste (2–1)||McKinney (0–2)||Edmondson (2)||3,220||11–6
|–
|- align="center" bgcolor="ddffdd"
| March 10 ||||No. 16||McKethan Stadium||12–6||Ball (3–2)||Cole (0–1)||None||3,009||12–6
|–
|- align="center" bgcolor="ddffdd"
| March 11 ||Harvard||No. 16||McKethan Stadium
|10–2||Augenstein (5–0)||Haviland (0–1)||None||3,043||13–6
|–
|- align="center" bgcolor="ddffdd"
| March 12 ||Harvard||No. 16||McKethan Stadium
|17–6||Hurst (1–0)||Castellanos (0–1)||None||2,999||14–6
|–
|- align="center" bgcolor="ddffdd"
| March 14 ||at ||No. 15||Jay Bergman FieldOrlando, FL
|10–3||O'Day (1–0)||Herold (0–3)||None||1,729||15–6
|–
|- align="center" bgcolor="ddffdd"
| March 17 ||No. 10 ||No. 15|| McKethan Stadium ||6–3||Ball (4–2)||Schmidt (4–1)||O'Day (4)||3,128||16–6
|1–0
|- align="center" bgcolor="ffdddd"
| March 18 ||No. 10 Arkansas||No. 15||McKethan Stadium
|2–3||Holloway (2–0)||Augenstein (5–1)||Maday (5)||3,204||16–7
|1–1
|- align="center" bgcolor="ddffdd"
| March 19 ||No. 10 Arkansas||No. 15||McKethan Stadium
|8–7||O'Day (2–0)||McLelland (2–1)||None||3,267||17–7
|2–1
|- align="center" bgcolor="ffdddd"
| March 21 ||||No. 9||McKethan Stadium
|6–7||Nery (3–2)||Wynn (0–1)||Elsemiller (5)||3,334||17–8
|–
|- align="center" bgcolor="ffdddd"
| March 24 ||at No. 7 ||No. 9||Sarge Frye FieldColumbia, SC
|1–4||Hempy (2–1)||Ball (4–3)||Cruse (1)||3,650||17–9
|2–2
|- align="center" bgcolor="ffdddd"
| March 25 ||at No. 7 South Carolina||No. 9||Sarge Frye Field
|5–6||Cisco (3–0)||Augenstein (5–2)||Pelzer (2)||4,278||17–10
|2–3
|- align="center" bgcolor="ffdddd"
| March 26 ||at No. 7 South Carolina||No. 9||Sarge Frye Field
|4–21||Beverly (5–1)||LaCoste (2–2)||None||4,019||17–11
|2–4
|- align="center" bgcolor="ddffdd"
| March 29 ||||||McKethan Stadium
|6–5||Edmondson (3–0)||Cassidy (2–1)||O'Day (5)||4,500||18–11
|–
|- align="center" bgcolor="ffdddd"
| March 31 ||No. 17 ||||McKethan Stadium||0–6||Price (4–2)||Ball (4–4)||None||4,048||18–12
|2–5
|-

|- align="center" bgcolor="ddffdd"
| April 1 ||No. 17 Vanderbilt||||McKethan Stadium
|6–4||Augenstein (6–2)||Buschmann (3–3)||O'Day (6)||3,378||19–12||3–5
|- align="center" bgcolor="ffdddd"
| April 2 ||No. 17 Vanderbilt||||McKethan Stadium||2–16||Crowell (4–0)||Hurst (1–1)||None||3,378||19–13
|3–6
|- align="center" bgcolor="ffdddd"
| April 4 ||vs. ||||Baseball GroundsJacksonville, FL
|5–6||Frawley (1–0)||O'Day (2–1)||None||6,210
|19–14
|–
|- align="center" bgcolor="ffdddd"
| April 7 ||at No. 25 ||||Cliff Hagan StadiumLexington, KY||7–8||Albers (2–1)||O'Day (2–2)||None||1,781||19–15
|3–7
|- align="center" bgcolor="ddffdd"
| April 8 ||at No. 25 Kentucky||||Cliff Hagan Stadium
|6–4||Augenstein (7–2)||Snipp (4–2)||None||1,536||20–15
|4–7
|- align="center" bgcolor="ffdddd"
| April 9 ||at No. 25 Kentucky||||Cliff Hagan Stadium
|6–8
|Dombrowsk (6–1)||Spottswood (1–1)||Baber (4)||1,668||20–16
|4–8
|- align="center" bgcolor="ddffdd"
| April 11 ||||||McKethan Stadium||8–2||Porter (1–0)||Kyles (3–5)||None||3,241||21–16
|–
|- align="center" bgcolor="ffdddd"
| April 14 ||at ||||Knoxville, TN
|2–4||Cobb (7–1)||Ball (4–5)||None||2,901||21–17
|4–9
|- align="center" bgcolor="ffdddd"
| April 15 ||at Tennessee||||||1–2||Adkins (5–4)||Augenstein (7–3)||None||2,856||21–18
|4–10
|- align="center" bgcolor="ddffdd"
| April 16 ||at Tennessee||||||15–4||Edmondson (4–0)||Lindblom (4–3)||None||1,917||22–18
|5–10
|- align="center" bgcolor="ddffdd"
| April 19 ||at No. 6 Florida StateRivalry||||Dick Howser StadiumTallahassee, FL
|8–3||Edmondson (5–0)||Hyde (7–1)||None||6,249||23–18||–
|- align="center" bgcolor="ffdddd"
| April 21 ||||||McKethan Stadium
|6–9||Butts (3–5)||Ball (4–6)||Greinke (5)||3,575||23–19||5–11
|- align="center" bgcolor="ddffdd"
| April 22 ||Auburn||||McKethan Stadium||4–1
|Augenstein (8–3)||Crawford (4–5)||O'Day (7)||3,652||24–19||6–11
|- align="center" bgcolor="ffdddd"
| April 23 ||Auburn||||McKethan Stadium
|4–5||Dennis (3–3)||Spottswood (1–2)||None||3,840
|24–20
|6–12
|- align="center" bgcolor="ffdddd"
| April 28 ||||||McKethan Stadium||0–7
|Westphal (4–0)||Ball (4–7)||None||3,275||24–21
|6–13
|- align="center" bgcolor="ffdddd"
| April 29 ||Georgia||||McKethan Stadium||3–9||Warren (6–2)||Augenstein (8–4)||None||3,358||24–22
|6–14
|- align="center" bgcolor="ffdddd"
| April 30 ||Georgia||||McKethan Stadium||6–9||Moreau (5–1)||Spottswood (1–3)||Fields (8)||3,308||24–23
|6–15
|-

|- align="center" bgcolor="ffdddd"
| May 5 ||at ||||Dudy Noble FieldStarkville, MS
|2–6
|Dunn (8–4)||Augenstein (8–5)||None||6,329||24–24
|6–16
|- align="center" bgcolor="ffdddd"
| May 6 ||at Mississippi State||||Dudy Noble Field||1–8||Pigott (5–0)||Ball (4–8)||None||–||24–25
|6–17
|- align="center" bgcolor="ddffdd"
| May 6 ||at Mississippi State||||Dudy Noble Field||9–6||Porter (2–0)||Weatherford (4–2)||None||6,614||25–25
|7–17
|- align="center" bgcolor="ddffdd"
| May 12 ||at No. 8 ||||Tuscaloosa, AL
|4–3||Augenstein (9–5)||Robert (6–5)||O'Day (8)||4,994||26–25
|8–17
|- align="center" bgcolor="ffdddd"
| May 13 ||at No. 8 Alabama||||||2–7||LeBlanc (8–0)||Ball (4–9)||None||4,657||26–26
|8–18
|- align="center" bgcolor="ffdddd"
| May 14 ||at No. 8 Alabama||||||4–8||Hunter (8–3)||Porter (2–1)||Robertson (8)||4,381||26–27
|8–19
|- align="center" bgcolor="ffdddd"
| May 18 ||||||McKethan Stadium||3–7||Dardar (6–3)||Augenstein (9–6)||Harris (3)||3,194||26–28
|8–20
|- align="center" bgcolor="ddffdd"
| May 19 ||LSU||||McKethan Stadium||8–710||O'Day (3–2)||Harris (1–2)||None||3,428||27–28
|9–20
|- align="center" bgcolor="ddffdd"
| May 20 ||LSU|||| McKethan Stadium ||10–5||Spottswood (2–3)||Coleman (5–5)||None||3,190||28–28
|10–20
|-

Rankings from Collegiate Baseball. All times Eastern. Retrieved from FloridaGators.com

See also 
 Florida Gators
 List of Florida Gators baseball players

References

External links 
 Gator Baseball official website

Florida Gators baseball seasons
Florida Gators baseball team
Florida Gators